Soterosanthus shepheardii is a species of orchid found in Ecuador and Colombia, and the only species of the monotypic genus Soterosanthus. This species segregated from Sievekingia because of its upright inflorescence. Flowers are somewhat similar to Sievekingia as is the plant stature, being on the small side, around 6" tall. Plants are semi-deciduous and warmth tolerant. Grow in small pots of medium grade bark mix under same conditions as for Gongora; shaded light, even moisture, drier in winter. It is a rarely seen relative of Stanhopea.

References

External links 

 Orchidworks.com Soterosanthus shepheardii

Monotypic Epidendroideae genera
Stanhopeinae genera
Stanhopeinae
Orchids of Colombia
Orchids of Ecuador